Fred Roe (1864 – 16 August 1947)  was a genre artist and illustrator, best known for his paintings of landscapes, portraits and military scenes.

Life and work
Roe was born in Cambridge, England, the son of Robert Henry Roe, painter and engraver; He went on to study at Heatherley School of Fine Art under Seymour Lucas. Roe first exhibited at the prestigious Royal Academy in 1877, was elected to the RBA in 1895, then to the Royal Institute of British Painters in 1909. He spent many years living in London being recorded in the 1901 census as living in Hampstead with his wife and son, Frederic Gordon Roe (1894–1985), who became an art critic.

Roe developed a successful career as a painter of historical genre subjects, often connected with the Tower of London. He painted several pictures of Joan of Arc, and also some showing incidents in the life of Nelson. He was an accomplished portrait painter and his work can be found in many public collections including the National Portrait Gallery in London. During his career, Roe was best known for his large historical compositions set in period costumes. He is known to have worked in oils and occasionally watercolour.

He later became a leading expert and collector of antique furniture. His book Ancient Coffers and Cupboards (1902) is an "admirable illustrated volume" on English medieval furniture. He was the author of several other reference books: A History of Oak Furniture (1920) and Ancient Church Chests and Chairs (1929). He also illustrated Vanishing England by P. H. Ditchfield<ref>Ditchfield, P. H. Vanishing England (E. P. Dutton & Co, 1910)</ref> and other books.

Notes

Further reading
Chester, Austin. The Art of Mr Fred Roe (The Windsor Magazine, March 1908).
Grant M. Waters. Dictionary of British Artists Working 1900-1950 (Eastbourne Fine Art, Dec 1976).
Roe, F. Gordon. Fred Roe (1864–1947). Historical and genre painter, author and antiquary, his life and art (self-published, 1978).
Roe, Fred. Ancient Church Chests and Chairs ( B.T. Batsford, 1929).
Roe, Fred.  Old Oak Furniture'' (1920)

External links
Paintings by Roe (National Portrait Gallery)
Paintings by Roe (National Maritime Museum)
Illustrations by Roe scanned by the British Library

19th-century English painters
English male painters
20th-century English painters
History painters
English illustrators
1947 deaths
1864 births
20th-century English male artists
19th-century English male artists